Arthur Andrews may refer to:
 Arthur Andrews (cricketer) (1856–1943), English cricketer
 Arthur Andrews (footballer, born 1891) (1891–1964), English footballer with Southampton
 Arthur Andrews (footballer, born 1903) (1903–1971), English footballer with Durham City and Sunderland
 Arthur F. Andrews (1876–1930), American cyclist
 Arthur Glenn Andrews (1909–2008), American politician
 Arthur Irving Andrews (1878–1967), American college professor  
 Arthur L. Andrews (1934–1996), Chief Master Sergeant of the U.S. Air Force 
 A. W. Andrews (1868–1959), British geographer, poet and mountaineer

See also
Arthur Andrew (disambiguation)